Siddipet is a city in the Indian state of Telangana. It is a municipality and serves as the headquarters of Siddipet district. The District Headquarters and police Commissionerate is located at Siddipet City.

Siddipet is a major urban hub and educational centre  for the nearby Towns and villages . It is governed by Siddipet Municipality and is the headquarters of the Siddipet district. The city is named for the African Siddi people of India; Siddi + pet (market), who had a historical presence in the Hyderabad State.

Demographics 

As of the 2011 Census of India, Siddipet had a population of 111,358.

Governance 
Siddipet municipality was formed in the year 1952.

Politics

Members of Parliament 

1952–1966: Constituency does not exist

2008 onwards: Constituency does not exist

Election results 

Siddipet falls under Siddipet (Assembly constituency) and is, in turn, a part of Medak (Lok Sabha constituency) of Telangana Legislative Assembly.

Economy

Tourism

Siddipet is being developed with tourism in mind. On December 1 2019, the suspension bridge on the Komati Cheruvu was inaugurated.

Information Technology Sector
There is an IT Tower under development in Siddipet, it is estimated to be completed some time in 2023.

Transport

Road 

Siddipet is well connected to nearby villages. It is also connected by (SH-16) from Suryapet city. The Telangana State Road Transport Corporation public transport buses to major destinations from Siddipet. A new national highway numbered NH 365B connects Siddipet with different district headquarters of the state Suryapet-Jangaon-Siddipet-Siricilla.

TSRTC operates buses from Siddipet to various destinations in the state.

Airports 
Rajiv Gandhi International Airport in Hyderabad is the nearest airport at a distance of 147 km by road. The other two nearest airports to Siddipet are Ramagundam Airport and Warangal Airport which are closed.

Railway 
Siddipet Station will be part of the Manoharabad-Kothapalli new rail line. As of January 2023, the rail station is under construction and the full line is scheduled to be completed by 2025.This will connect the city to Hyderabad, Secundarabad, Karimnagar etc.

Notable people 

K. Chandrashekar Rao
 T. Harish Rao
 Kapu Rajaiah
 Sampoornesh Babu

Notes

References 

 
Cities in Telangana
Cities and towns in Siddipet district
Siddhi people